Westcott E. S. Moulton (1906-1983) was an American ice hockey player and coach who was the driving force behind Brown's hockey program revival after World War II. An exciting player in his youth, the class of '31 graduate returned to his alma mater after serving in the Navy, working in various capacities until 1962 which included being the head coach of the ice hockey team after convincing then-President Henry Wriston to restart the program. Moulton was an inaugural member of Brown's Athletic Hall of Fame in 1971.

Head coaching record

References

External links

1906 births
1983 deaths
American men's ice hockey centers
Brown Bears baseball players
Brown Bears football players
Brown Bears men's ice hockey coaches
Brown Bears men's ice hockey players
Ice hockey coaches from Massachusetts
Sportspeople from Boston
Ice hockey people from Boston